Crazy Dips is a brand of candy produced by Chupa Chups  in Spain.  They come with a 16 g packet filled with popping candy and a lollipop for dipping.  This lollipop is often shaped like a foot and is dipped in a pouch of Pop Rocks. Crazy Dips comes in two flavours: Strawberry and Cola, though the Strawberry is by far the most common variant.

This product was developed by a Korean company named Jeongwoo Confectionery.  Jeongwoo was a producer of popping candy (pop rocks) for Asian markets since 1985.  When the company produced popping candy, they used a certain sizes of popping candy. The acceptable particles size for the popping candy was from 0.5 mm to 5.16 mm.  But these quality standards were made a headache to the company because there were always some powders which were out of the standard size ranges. 

A general manager of Jeongwoo tried to find a solution to use the remaining powders.  One day, he got an idea that he used a lollipop dipping the powder.   Jeongwoo developed new concept of candy in the market which was a dipping candy.  This company introduced the new product to Chupa Chups.  Chupa Chups decided testing this product in US market, year 1988, under the brand name, 'Crazy Dips'.

References

Perfetti Van Melle brands